Renforth, referred to during planning as Renforth Gateway, is a bus station on the border of the cities of Mississauga and Toronto, in Ontario, Canada. Located at Eglinton Avenue and Renforth Drive (although the station entrance is on Commerce Boulevard), it is the eastern terminus of the Mississauga Transitway and is close to the interchange between Highway 401 and Highway 427.

Service consists of bus rapid transit on the Mississauga Transitway, local MiWay and Toronto Transit Commission (TTC) bus routes, GO Transit express routes on the Highway 401 / Highway 407 corridor and an express connection to Kipling subway station via Highway 427.

Line 5 Eglinton, a light rail transit line under construction along Eglinton Avenue in Toronto, is slated to reach and have a station at Renforth circa 2030.

Planning and construction
The Renforth site was identified by Metrolinx in 2012 as a transportation mobility hub, which would integrate bus rapid transit and local bus service.

Construction of the station began in 2014. The old TTC bus loop located at the northwest corner of Renforth and Eglinton was decommissioned and incorporated into the site.

Bus routes

GO Transit
19 Mississauga/North York
29 Mississauga/Guelph
40 Hamilton/Richmond Hill Pearson Express

MiWay 
7 Airport
24 Northwest
35 Eglinton (board on curbside stops outside station)
39 Britannia
43 Matheson–Argentia
57 Courtneypark
74 Explorer
87 Meadowvale–Skymark
100 Airport Express
107 Malton Express
109 Meadowvale Express

TTC
32A Eglinton West
112 West Mall

Future Line 5 Eglinton connection

Renforth station will be the western terminus of the second phase of Line 5 Eglinton – a light rail transit line that is part of the Toronto subway system. In April 2022, construction of the "Crosstown West Extension" began along Eglinton Avenue to the east in Toronto from Mount Dennis station. The LRT station will be located below grade in an open trench just north of the transitway station. This station will be the first in the Toronto subway system to be located in the City of Mississauga.

In mid-December 2021, parts of the tunnel boring machines (TBMs) that would bore the twin tunnels  eastwards along Eglinton from a launch shaft at the future station site, arrived and were assembled prior to excavation. The first TBM, dubbed Renny (the name being a reference to Renforth Drive), began tunnelling in April 2022 but the second, named Rexy, started later, by early August, as the launch area was only big enough to launch one TBM at a time. The extraction shaft will be near the west side of Scarlett Road.

A proposed third phase of the line would extend and turn north, where it would terminate at the proposed Pearson Regional Transit Centre located north of Toronto Pearson International Airport Terminals 1 and 3. As an interim project, land was preserved for future dedicated bus lanes to the airport.

References

External links

Progress at Renforth Gateway - Mississauga Transitway

Mississauga Transitway
GO Transit bus terminals
2017 establishments in Ontario